Lake Paracota (possibly from Aymara phara dry,  quta lake,  "dry lake") is a lake in Peru located in the Tacna Region, Tarata Province, Susapaya District. Paracota lies south of the larger Lake Vilacota.

References 

Lakes of Peru
Lakes of Tacna Region